North Kesteven District Council in Lincolnshire, England is elected every four years.

Political control
The first election to the council was held in 1973, initially operating as a shadow authority before coming into its powers on 1 April 1974. Political control of the council since 1973 has been held by the following parties:

Leadership
The leaders of the council since 2001 have been:

Council elections
1973 North Kesteven District Council election
1976 North Kesteven District Council election
1979 North Kesteven District Council election (New ward boundaries)
1983 North Kesteven District Council election (District boundary changes took place but the number of seats remained the same)
1987 North Kesteven District Council election (District boundary changes took place but the number of seats remained the same)
1991 North Kesteven District Council election (District boundary changes took place but the number of seats remained the same)
1995 North Kesteven District Council election
1999 North Kesteven District Council election (New ward boundaries)
2003 North Kesteven District Council election
2007 North Kesteven District Council election (New ward boundaries increased the number of seats by three) 
2011 North Kesteven District Council election
2015 North Kesteven District Council election
2019 North Kesteven District Council election

By-election results

1995-1999

1999-2003

2003-2007

2007-2011

References

North Kesteven election results
By-election results

External links
North Kesteven District Council

 
Council elections in Lincolnshire
North Kesteven District
District council elections in England